Vita coi figli is a 1990 Italian television film directed by Dino Risi and broadcast by Canale 5.

Cast 
Giancarlo Giannini:  Adriano Setti
Monica Bellucci: Elda
Corinne Cléry: Valeria

: Francesca

References

External links

1990 films
Italian drama films
Films directed by Dino Risi
Films scored by Stelvio Cipriani
Italian television films
1990 drama films
1990s Italian-language films
1990s Italian films